Esteban Dalmases is a Spanish actor.

He played 1st Inspector in Devil's Kiss (1976), directed by Georges Gigo; and sheriff assistant in Four Candles for Garringo (1971), directed by Ignacio F. Iquino and starring Robert Woods.

Filmography

References

Date of birth missing (living people)
20th-century Spanish male actors
Spanish male television actors
Spanish male film actors
Living people
Year of birth missing (living people)